Anthony Blake (–1787) was an Irish prelate of the Roman Catholic Church. He served as Bishop of Ardagh and Clonmacnoise from 1756 to 1758 and Archbishop of Armagh from 1758 to 1787.

Biography
Blake was the younger of two sons of Andrew Blake of Kilvine, County Mayo. His family were one of the Tribes of Galway; notable members of his family included James "Spanish" Blake, John Blake (mayor), John Henry Blake and Sally Blake (duelist).

He was a granduncle of Walter Blake Kirwan and Anthony Richard Blake.

Blake returned to Ireland from France about 1731, having been educated at Saint-Omer and Louvain. He was appointed priest in the archdiocese of Tuam, holding the posts of dean of the chapter and vicar general to the archbishop. From 1741 to 1756, he served as Warden of Galway, his most nobable act been the erection of a new parish chapel in the town's middle street, which stood 'till 1833.

References

 Dictionary of Irish Biography, pp. 579–80, Cambridge, 2010.

1700s births
1787 deaths
18th-century Roman Catholic archbishops in Ireland
Christian clergy from County Mayo
Roman Catholic archbishops of Armagh
Roman Catholic bishops of Ardagh and Clonmacnoise